Muselzeidung is a newspaper published in Luxembourg.

References

External links
Website of mussel and acid drawing

Luxembourgish-language newspapers
Newspapers published in Luxembourg